The Design 1016 ship (full name Emergency Fleet Corporation Design 1016) was a wood-hulled cargo ship design approved for production by the United States Shipping Board's Emergency Fleet Corporation (EFT) in World War I. All were built by the Grays Harbor Motorship Company in Aberdeen, Washington. They were referred to as the "Ward"-type after M.R. Ward, manager at the Grays Harbor shipyard.  All the hulls were laid down in 1919. The first ship of the class, the SS Adria, was listed at 3,132 gross tons with dimensions of 272.8 x 49.3 x 25.6, 1400 indicated horsepower, and carried a crew of 36.

Of the 8 ships ordered, 4 were cancelled, 3 were later completed for the National Oil Company (SS Agylla, SS Agron, SS Adria) and one (Agathon) was destroyed in a fire before completion.

References

Standard ship types of the United States